One-stop career centers (or One-Stop centers) are public employment offices in the United States. They are workforce information and education offices set up by Workforce Investment Boards as directed by the Workforce Investment Act of 1998. The Workforce Investment Act was repealed and replaced by the 2014 Workforce Innovation and Opportunity Act with an annual budget of $3.3 billion.

One-stop career centers are implemented in all US States under a variety of different local names. CareerOneStop is sponsored by the U.S. Department of Labor, Employment and Training Administration and produced by the Minnesota Department of Employment and Economic Development. CareerOneStop is a partner of the American Job Center network.

Types of one-stop career centers
Comprehensive One-Stop Career Centers - Provide a full array of employment and training related services for workers, youth and businesses. These locations include the mandatory Workforce Investment Act (WIA) partners on-site.

Affiliate One-Stop Career Centers - Provide limited employment and training related services for workers, youth, and businesses. These locations do not include all the mandatory Workforce Investment Act (WIA) partners (i.e., Veterans, Vocational Rehabilitation) on-site.

Centers by states
 Alaska - Job Center
 California - America's Job Center of California (AJCC)
 Florida - CareerSource Florida 
 Indiana - WorkOne
 Maryland - Maryland Workforce Exchange/American Job Center
 Mississippi - WIN Job Center
 Ohio - OhioMeansJobs
 Texas - WorkInTexas
 Washington - WorkSource
 Pennsylvania - PA CareerLink
 Michigan - Michigan Works!
 Massachusetts - MassHire Career Centers
 North Carolina - NCWorks Career Centers
 Virginia - Virginia Career Works Fairfax
 West Virginia - WorkForce WV
 Wyoming - Workforce Services/Center

References

External links
Website at the US Department of Labor
 Website for Career One Stop

Career advice services